Bjarne Gulbrandsen (16 April 1889 – 29 August 1966) was a Norwegian footballer. He played in one match for the Norway national football team in 1913.

References

External links
 

1889 births
1966 deaths
Norwegian footballers
Norway international footballers
Place of birth missing
Association footballers not categorized by position